Elections to Aberdeenshire Council were held on 6 May 1999; the same day as elections to the Scottish Parliament and to the 31 other Scottish local authorities. 68 councillors were elected from 68 wards using First Past The Post (FPTP). This election was conducted under boundary changes with an increased number of seats from the 47 used in the 1995 election. The Liberal Democrats were the largest party, with councillors also being elected representing the SNP, Independents, and Conservatives.

Overall result

Ward Results

References

1999
1999 Scottish local elections